Sisyrinchium is a large genus of annual to perennial flowering plant in the family Iridaceae. Native to the New World, the species are known as blue-eyed grasses and, though not true grasses and in varieties with flower colors other than blue, are monocots.

Several species in the eastern United States are threatened or endangered.

Description

These are not true grasses, but many species have the general appearance of grasses, as they are low-growing plants with long, thin leaves. They often grow on grasslands. Many species resemble irises, to which they are more closely related. Most species grow as perennial plants, from a rhizome, though some are short-lived (e.g. Sisyrinchium striatum), and some are annuals (e.g. Sisyrinchium iridifolium).

The flowers are relatively simple and often grow in clusters.

Many species, particularly the South American ones, are not blue, despite the common name. The genus includes species with blue, white, yellow, and purple petals, often with a contrasting centre. Of the species in the United States, the Western Blue-eyed Grass (Sisyrinchium bellum) is sometimes found with white flowers, while the California Golden-eyed Grass (Sisyrinchium californicum) has yellow flowers.

Taxonomy

The genus was named by Carl Linnaeus in 1753, based on the species Sisyrinchium bermudiana (commonly called Bermudiana). The taxonomy of this genus is rather perplexing and confusing, as several of these species, such as Sisyrinchium angustifolium, form complexes with many variants named as species. More genetic research and cladistic analysis need to be performed to sort out the relationships between the species. Some species, notably Sisyrinchium douglasii, have been transferred to the separate genus Olsynium.

Etymology 
Sisyrinchíon is the Greek word, recorded by Pliny and Theophrastus, for the Barbary nut iris (Iris or Moraea sisyrinchium), and refers to the way the corm tunics resemble a shaggy goat's-hair coat, sisýra. Authors as early as 1666 give the dubious etymology of Latin sūs "pig" and Greek rhynchos "nose", referring to pigs grubbing the roots. As Goldblatt and Manning explain, "the reason for applying the name to a genus of New World Iridaceae was apparently arbitrary."

Selected species 

There are up to 200 species, including:

Gallery

References

Rudall, P. J., A. Y. Kenton, and T. J. Lawrence. 1986 -  An anatomical and chromosomal investigation of Sisyrinchium and allied genera. Bot. Gaz. 147: 466–477 Ajilvsgi, Geyata. 1984 - Wildflowers of Texas. Library of Congress: 84-50025

External links

 Flora of North America
 Sections of the genus

 
Iridaceae genera